Fast Paced World is a 2008 album by The Duhks. It is released under the Sugar Hill Records label. The album features Irish folk music, Latin percussion, American folk, and gospel music, as well as singing in English, French, and Portuguese.

Track listing 
 "Mighty Storm" (traditional)
 "Fast Paced World" (Sarah Dugas)
 "This Fall" (S. Dugas)
 "Adam's 3-Step" (Tania Elizabeth)
 "Toujours Vouloir" (S. Dugas)
 "You Don't See It" (Dan Frechette)
 "Ship High in Transit" (Leonard Podolak)
 "Magalenha" (Carlinhos Brown)
 "Sleepin' Is All I Wanna Do (Stars on a Sunny Day)" (S. Dugas)
 "95 South" (L. Podolak, Jonathan Byrd)
 "New Rigged Ship (Cumberland Gap/Paddy on the Turnpike/New Rigged Ship)" (all traditional, arranged by the Duhks)
 "I See You" (T. Elizabeth, S. Dugas)

Personnel
Tania Elizabeth - fiddles, strings, backing vocals, mandolin (tracks 6 & 11), Rhodes (track 11), Pump organ (track 4)
Sarah Dugas - lead vocals, backing vocals
Jordan McConnell - guitars, baritone banjo (track 2), backing vocals
Leonard Podolak - banjos, backing vocals, lead vocals (track 10)
Christian Dugas - drums, percussion, mirambula (track 9), backing vocals

References

The Duhks albums
2008 albums
Sugar Hill Records albums